The 1966 Boston Red Sox season was the 66th season in the franchise's Major League Baseball history. The Red Sox finished ninth in the American League (AL) with a record of 72 wins and 90 losses, 26 games behind the AL and World Series champion Baltimore Orioles. After this season, the Red Sox would not lose 90 games again until 2012.

Offseason 
 November 29, 1965: Jimy Williams was drafted from the Red Sox by the St. Louis Cardinals in the 1965 first-year draft.
 November 30, 1965: Eddie Bressoud was traded by the Red Sox to the New York Mets for Joe Christopher.

Regular season

Season standings

Record vs. opponents

Opening Day lineup

Notable transactions 
 June 6, 1966: Galen Cisco was signed as a free agent by the Red Sox.
 June 14, 1966: Joe Christopher and Earl Wilson were traded by the Red Sox to the Detroit Tigers for Don Demeter and a player to be named later. The Tigers completed the deal by sending Julio Navarro to the Red Sox on June 21.

Roster

Player stats

Batting

Starters by position 
Note: Pos = Position; G = Games played; AB = At bats; H = Hits; Avg. = Batting average; HR = Home runs; RBI = Runs batted in

Other batters 
Note: G = Games played; AB = At bats; H = Hits; Avg. = Batting average; HR = Home runs; RBI = Runs batted in

Pitching

Starting pitchers 
Note: G = Games pitched; IP = Innings pitched; W = Wins; L = Losses; ERA = Earned run average; SO = Strikeouts

Other pitchers 
Note: G = Games pitched; IP = Innings pitched; W = Wins; L = Losses; ERA = Earned run average; SO = Strikeouts

Relief pitchers 
Note: G = Games pitched; W = Wins; L = Losses; SV = Saves; ERA = Earned run average; SO = Strikeouts

Farm system 

LEAGUE CHAMPIONS: Toronto

Source:

References

External links
1966 Boston Red Sox team page at Baseball Reference
1966 Boston Red Sox season at baseball-almanac.com

Boston Red Sox seasons
Boston Red Sox
Boston Red Sox
1960s in Boston